Dynamite is a 2015 Indian Telugu-language action thriller film directed by Deva Katta and produced by Manchu Vishnu under the banner 24 Frames Factory featuring himself, Pranitha Subhash, J. D. Chakravarthy in pivotal roles. It is the official remake of Tamil film Arima Nambi. Katta, however, said that he shot the film for nine days only and walked out due to creative differences. Katta was credited as the film's director nonetheless.
Stunts and action scenes were directed by Vijayan. The audio sound track of the film was released on 6 June 2015.

Storyline
The story begins with a girl named Anamika eating golgappas when a rich boy teases a waitress. She is distressed and asks her friends why isn't anyone helping the girl. Then a man named Shivaji, a.k.a. Shiv beats the rich boys. Anamika is impressed and asks the next day she messages him, and his friends compel him to message her for a date. She replies positively, and the two go for their first date. Anamika is impressed by Shiv's modesty. The two then get drunk, and Anamika invites him to her home. At her home, the two are about to kiss when Shiv stops and goes to the bathroom as he is excited. He hears a scream in the room and goes there to see that some goons are taking Anamika away. He follows them but lost track of them when a tanker comes in front of him. He calls the police, who shuns him off, but Swaminath, a sincere police officer, goes with him to Anamika's home where the security guard tells the cops he is lying and Anamika is in Goa for 4 days. They go to Anamika's flat, which is all set, and all the things broken during the fight are fixed. They call Anamika's father, Ranganath Dasari, who happens to be the CEO of news channel 24 who confirms the security guard statement. Swaminath drops him home and asks him to drink less. He enters his friend's home and takes his bike. He reaches Anamika father's home and sees the SI and the goons. The SI is alerted that Shiv is present there. They find him and are about to kill him when the Swaminath saves him. They see that Ranganath is being inquired by goons about a memory card in which a party clip is recorded. He says that the chip is with his senior reporter. The goons kill the reporter and get the card from him. The goons also kill Ranganath. A fight ensues between Shiv, the Police inspector and the goons in which the Swaminath dies in the attack.

Shiv then follows the goons and reaches the place where Anamika is held gagged. He also manages to get the chip. They both run with goons behind them. Meanwhile, the leader of the goons, Billu arrives and starts following them. Shiv and Anamika try to open the card, but it requires a password. They go to Ranganath's office to take a diary containing all the passwords. They are still unable to crack the code and thus goes to a hotel to hack the code. They are about to open the video when Shiv's friend comes. It slips from his mouth that goons are following him, to which Shiv replies that he never told him about the goons. Shiv's friend reveals that the goons offered him Rs. 1 crore and at the same time, the goons arrive, and Shiv's friend is killed in a shootout. Shiv and Anamika are on the run again. They enter a mall as they come to know that the police are watching them and are on the side of goons on the order of IB minister Rishi Dev who is behind the card. Shiv asks Anamika to gather the media and hand over the card to the governor; meanwhile, he will distract the police. The police discover their location and kills a man who they assume to be Shiv. The police tells the media that Shiv used to supply drugs to Anamika, and they both killed Anamika's father and the police inspector. Meanwhile, an inspector also tells the minister about the video, and Shiv also sees the video when the central minister accidentally kills a model named Neha Sharma as she is pregnant with his child. Shiv copies the video to a pen drive while the minister kills the inspector watching the video. The minister deletes the video and thus not allowing it to be downloaded. Meanwhile, it is revealed that the minister is a candidate for being the Prime Minister. Shiv summons a meeting with the minister, where Shiv tricks him into taking a bag containing the bomb. Shiva, through a distraction, takes the minister in a train. The police are on the run. Shiv starts recording the minister while Anamika sends the link of the video to renowned news channels. Just then, the police force gathered on the spot, and they arrest Shiv. However, the video showing that the minister is saying that he killed Neha Sharma is still being telecast by a button camera which is revealed later. Seeing the video, the high command ordered the police to release Shiv and arrest the minister.

The scene then shifts to Shiv and Anamika giving Rs. 2 crore to Swaminath's daughter for her father's work, and the film ends with the two going to Shiv's home together.

Cast

Production

Development 
Kalaipuli S. Thanu sold the Telugu remake rights of his production Arima Nambi to his friend include Telugu actor Mohan Babu after weeks of its release. Mohan Babu's elder son Manchu Vishnu was confirmed to play the male lead while Deva Katta was signed as a director. Vishnu also bankrolled the film under his banner 24 Frames Factory. He registered the title Edhureetha for the film and an official confirmation was awaited. The film's title however was announced as Dynamite on 1 March 2015.

Casting 
For his role, Vishnu planned to learn freestyle martial arts. He pierced his ears for the role on Deva Katta's request. He also had to sport a long tattoo on his left arm and said that the tattoo gave an edge to his character in the film. Vishnu underwent training in freestyle martial arts at Bangkok from mid December 2014. Adah Sharma was reported to be the film's female lead in early November 2014. Trisha Choudury was also considered for the female lead role in mid December 2014. A press release on 28 December 2014 confirmed Pranitha Subhash as the film's female lead, and J. D. Chakravarthy reprising his role as the lead antagonist from the original.

She was reported to play the role of a final year college student, and regarding her selection, Vishnu said, "We were looking for an actress who can have a classy look and she fits the bill. Her look will be a revelation in the movie. Moreover, this is the first time she's paired opposite me, so I believe that our pairing will look fresh on screen". He also added that Pranitha would join the film's sets in early January 2015.

Filming 
The film's first schedule ended on 26 September 2014. The second schedule began on 1 January 2015. Vishnu wanted to complete the film as quickly as possible. By 1 March 2015, the film reached its final stages of production. The climax sequences were shot at Kotla Vijay Bhaskar Reddy Indoor Stadium in early April 2015 on J. D. Chakravarthy, Vishnu and around two thousand junior artists under the supervision of Vijayan. With this, the talkie part of the film was wrapped up.

Soundtrack 
The audio launch of the movie was organised at Hyderabad on 6 June 2015. Vishnu Manchu's father, actor Mohan Babu, younger brother, actor Manchu Manoj and director Dasari Narayana Rao were present at the music launch as chief guests. Only three songs were composed for the film.

References

External links
 

2015 films
Telugu remakes of Tamil films
2015 action thriller films
2010s Telugu-language films
Films scored by Achu Rajamani
Indian action thriller films
Films about terrorism in India